The James H. and Rhoda H. Gardner House at 187 East 300 North in Lehi, Utah, United States, was built in 1907.  It was listed on the National Register of Historic Places in 1998.

It was home of James Gardner, whose experience sugar refining from sugar cane in Hawaii, who first successfully boiled sugar from sugar beets in Utah in 1891, working for the Utah Sugar Company.

References

Houses completed in 1907
Houses in Utah County, Utah
Houses on the National Register of Historic Places in Utah
Victorian architecture in Utah
Buildings and structures in Lehi, Utah
National Register of Historic Places in Utah County, Utah